Gateway Church is a non-denominational, charismatic Christian multi-site megachurch based in Southlake, Texas, near Fort Worth. It estimates its weekly attendance at 100,000 as of 2022. and is one of the largest churches in the United States. The church was founded and is led by Senior Pastor Robert Morris.

History
On September 16, 1999, Pastor Robert Morris began to plan an evangelistic church in Southlake, Texas. Gateway Church's first service was held on Easter morning, April 23, 2000, at the Hilton Hotel in Grapevine. Approximately 180 people attended the service. The church grew, and moved to an old movie theater in Grapevine. 
In June 2003 the church moved into its first permanent building, a 600-seat,  facility on Southlake Blvd. In 2010 Gateway opened its current facility, a  property with a 4,000-seat sanctuary.

In 2017 Gateway Church confirmed 10–15% downsizing of their entire staff. The downsizing story gained national attention by other church media outlets.

Campuses 

In 2008, the church began work on a new main campus located along State Highway 114. The project included a 4,000-seat sanctuary. It opened on November 13, 2010. Mark Jobe, father of contemporary Christian singer Kari Jobe, serves as the Campus Pastor.

In early 2019, Gateway Church announced it was starting a ministry inside the Coffield Unit, the largest prison in the Texas Department of Criminal Justice. It is open to minimum security inmates (and, with special permission, medium security inmates) but all inmates may obtain church materials. The church also ministers at the Estes Unit outside of Venus. Stephen Wilson, an ex-offender who earned his masters from Liberty University and has ministered in prisons previously, serves as the leader of both of these prison efforts. The church uses the term 'campus' in describing each prison outreach program.

Ministries

The King's University at Gateway 

The King's University was founded in 1997 by Jack W. Hayford. in Van Nuys, California.  In September 2012, The King's University at Gateway was launched. The school offers full accredited undergraduate, master's, and a doctorate degree.

Gateway Worship 

Gateway Church utilizes its  to lead worship services and create original music that it sells on a commercial record label. Its Live album God Be Praised was released on November 9, 2010, with Japanese, Korean and Portuguese versions released in 2012. The live album, Walls, which was released on October 2, 2015, reached No. 1 on Billboards Top Christian Albums Chart.

References

External links 

Evangelical megachurches in the United States
Megachurches in Texas
Christian organizations established in 2000
Evangelical churches in Dallas